Pointz is a surname. Notable people with the surname include:

Robert Pointz (1588–1665), English landowner and politician
John Pointz (died 1633), English landowner and politician

See also
Point (surname)
Poyntz (disambiguation)